Aue Stagecoach Inn is a complex of three structures built by German immigrant Max Aue and is located on Boerne Stage Rd. and I-10, in Leon Springs, county of Bexar, in the U.S. state of Texas. It was added to the National Register of Historic Places in 1979, and is an example of 19th century vernacular architecture of Texas.

Saltbox house 

Max Aue was born in Anhalt-Köthen, Germany in 1826 and immigrated to Texas in 1852. He purchased a tract of land from John O. Meusebach, on which in 1855 he built a  story saltbox limestone rubble house with exterior steps leading to a cellar. Inside the structure was a staircase leading to the upper loft that Aue used as his residence. The lower 2-room level functioned as a mercantile store. The house was a stop on the San Antonio-Boerne Stage Road. During the 1970s the saltbox house was given structural upgrades and expansions to convert it into a restaurant.

Dog trot house 

When he married Emma Toepperwein in February 1857, he built a 1-story stuccoed dog trot double-pen cedar log cabin as their new home. As the family grew, extensions were made to the cabin. The dog trot house was added to the San Antonio project of the Historic American Buildings Survey in 1968. The survey noted that the 2-chimneyed dirt floor house measured , and that the diameters of the individual logs measured .

Greek revival hotel 

A 2-story Greek Revival style structure was added to the complex in 1878, to function as a hotel for travelers along the stage route. In a reverse of how the original saltbox house functioned, the new 2-story house provided for family living quarters on the bottom floor. Guest quarters were on the second floor. The  2-story veranda was done in the Victorian style of architecture. The dog trot cabin was later incorporated into the hotel on the ground level through the south rooms and an interconnected shed.

Gallery

See also 

Rudolph Aue, the son of Max Aue founded Rudy's Country Store and Bar-B-Q in Leon Springs.
The Plehwe Stagecoach Inn is just around the corner within 75 yards distance.

References

German-American culture in Texas
National Register of Historic Places in Bexar County, Texas
Hotel buildings on the National Register of Historic Places in Texas
Houses in Bexar County, Texas